Lorougnon Christ Remi (born 15 February 1988), or simply Christ Remi, is an Ivorian professional footballer who plays as a forward for Bangladeshi club Rahmatganj MFS.

References

External links 
 
 
 
 

Ivorian footballers
Ivorian expatriate footballers
Expatriate footballers in Jordan
Expatriate footballers in Lebanon
Al-Baqa'a Club players
Lebanese Premier League players
Shabab Al Sahel FC players
Al Ansar FC players
Tadamon Sour SC players
Shabab El Bourj SC players
1988 births
Living people
Association football forwards
Churchill Brothers FC Goa players
I-League players
Expatriate footballers in India